The 2020 T20I Nordic Cup was a planned Twenty20 International (T20I) cricket tournament that had been due to take place in Denmark between 26 and 28 August 2020. The participating teams were to be the hosts Denmark, along with Finland and Germany. The six-match double round-robin series, followed by a final, would have been played at Svanholm Park in Brøndby. The visiting sides were each also scheduled to play a warm-up match against the hosts on 25 August 2020 prior to the start of the tournament. Denmark had also prepared for the tournament by hosting a tour of the Norwegian national team that consisted of two 50-over matches and four unofficial Twenty20 matches between 27 and 31 July 2020, with Denmark winning both of the 50-over matches and the T20 series ending level at two wins apiece.

The tournament was cancelled on 19 August 2020 due to increasing rates of COVID-19 infection in Denmark resulting in travel restrictions. Cricket Finland provisionally agreed to play the same series in early summer 2021.

Squads

Tour matches

Round robin

Fixtures

Final

References

Associate international cricket competitions in 2020
Cricket events cancelled due to the COVID-19 pandemic